Strużyna may refer to the following places in Poland:
Strużyna, Lower Silesian Voivodeship (south-west Poland)
Strużyna, Warmian-Masurian Voivodeship (north Poland)